Pardeep  is an Indian given name. Notable people with the name include:

Pardeep Mor , Indian field hockey player
Pardeep Narwal, kabaddi player
Pardeep Sahu, cricketer
Pardeep Singh,  weightlifter

See also
Pradeep Choudhary, Fijian politician
Pradeep Sharma, police officer

Hindu given names
Indian given names